The County is a 2019 Icelandic melodrama directed by Grímur Hákonarson. It was screened in the Contemporary World Cinema section at the 2019 Toronto International Film Festival.

Cast
 Arndís Hrönn Egilsdóttir as Inga
 Þorsteinn Bachmann as Oddur Policeman 
 Þorsteinn Gunnar Bjarnason as Gummi the Painter
 Daniel Hans Erlendsson as Heiðar
 Hafdís Helga Helgadóttir as Katla T.V. Reporter

Reception
The site's critical consensus reads, "Led by Arndís Hrönn Egilsdóttir's remarkable work in the starring role, The County is a David vs. Goliath story that speaks rousing truth to power." The Guardian gave the film a 4/5 star rating calling it a "stirring drama" in their pick of the week feature.

References

External links
 

2019 films
2019 comedy films
Icelandic drama films
2010s Icelandic-language films
Films directed by Grímur Hákonarson